Asterocheridae is a family of copepods belonging to the order Siphonostomatoida.

Genera

Genera:
 Acontiophorus Brady, 1880
 Andapontius Lee, J. & I.H.Kim, 2017
 Asterocheres Boeck, 1859

References

Copepods